Tomoyuki Arakawa (born May 22, 1968) is a Japanese mathematician, and a professor at the RIMS of the Kyoto University. His research interests are representation theory and vertex algebras and he is known especially for the work in W-algebras.
He obtained his Ph.D. from the University of Nagoya in 1999. In 2018 he was invited speaker at the International Congress of Mathematicians in Rio de Janeiro. He won the MSJ Autumn Prize in 2017 for his work on representation theory of W-algebras.

Selected publications

References

External links 
Personal website

Japanese mathematicians
Academic staff of Kyoto University
1968 births
Living people